Patterson Creek Mountain is a mountain ridge that forms the border between Mineral and Hampshire counties and Grant and Hardy Counties in West Virginia's Eastern Panhandle. The mountain's namesake, Patterson Creek, parallels its western flank. The southern end of the Patterson Creek Mountain is near the confluence of Lunice Creek and the South Branch Potomac River and its northern end is located southwest of Springfield. The mountain reaches its highest elevation at Charles Knob.

Summits and Knobs 

Patterson Creek Mountain is a mountain ridge made up of multiple peaks. The following are listed from the mountain's southern end to its northern end.

 Charles Knob, 
 Round Knob, 
 Turkey Mountain, 
 Huckleberry Ridge, 
 Slate Lick Knob, 
 Middle Ridge, 
 Buck Ridge,

References 

Landforms of Grant County, West Virginia
Landforms of Mineral County, West Virginia
Ridges of Hampshire County, West Virginia
Ridges of Hardy County, West Virginia
Ridges of West Virginia
Northwestern Turnpike